Raoul Fernandes is a Canadian poet from Vancouver, British Columbia. His debut poetry collection Transmitter and Receiver, published in 2015, won the Dorothy Livesay Poetry Prize in 2016, and was shortlisted for the Gerald Lampert Award and the ReLit Award for Poetry.

References

External links

21st-century Canadian poets
21st-century Canadian male writers
Canadian male poets
Writers from Vancouver
Living people
Year of birth missing (living people)